Song Review: A Greatest Hits Collection is a double-disc compilation album by Stevie Wonder. It was also released as a single disc edition which contained 6 tracks not featured on the 2CD release. The Australian edition has a slightly different track listing.

Track listings

Double disc edition
Disc one
"Part-Time Lover" (Stevie Wonder) (7" single version) (From In Square Circle) – 3:43
"I Just Called to Say I Love You" (Wonder) (Single version) (From the Original Motion Picture Soundtrack The Woman in Red) – 4:21
"Superstition" (Wonder) (Single version) (From Talking Book) – 3:59
"Sir Duke" (Wonder) (From Songs in the Key of Life) – 3:51
"My Cherie Amour" (Henry Cosby, Wonder, Sylvia Moy) (From My Cherie Amour) – 2:51
"I Was Made to Love Her" (Cosby, Lulu Mae Hardaway, Moy) (From I Was Made to Love Her) – 2:35
"Overjoyed" (Wonder) (From In Square Circle) – 3:41
"Hey Love" (Clarence Paul, Morris Broadnax, Wonder) (From Down to Earth) – 2:42
"Signed, Sealed, Delivered I'm Yours" (Wonder, Lee Garrett, Syreeta Wright, Hardaway) (From Signed, Sealed & Delivered) – 2:37
"You Are the Sunshine of My Life" (Wonder) (Single version) (From Talking Book) – 2:54
"Ribbon in the Sky" (Wonder) (Edited version) (From Original Musiquarium I) – 3:42
"Master Blaster (Jammin')" (Wonder) (7" single version) (From Hotter than July) – 4:49
"Living for the City" (Wonder) (Single version) (From Innervisions) – 3:41
"Uptight (Everything's Alright)" (Cosby, Moy, Wonder) (From Up-Tight) – 2:52
"Lately" (Wonder) (From Hotter than July) – 4:04
"Do I Do" (Wonder) (From Original Musiquarium I) – 10:27

Disc two
"Send One Your Love" (Stevie Wonder) (From Journey Through "The Secret Life of Plants") – 4:01
"Ebony and Ivory" (Paul McCartney & Stevie Wonder) (Paul McCartney) (From Paul McCartney's Tug of War) – 3:40
"All I Do" (Wonder, Paul, Broadnax) (From Hotter than July) – 5:16
"That Girl" (Wonder) (From Original Musiquarium I) – 5:16
"For Your Love" (Wonder) (7" single version) (From Conversation Peace) – 4:03
"I Wish" (Wonder) (From Songs in the Key of Life) – 4:11
"You Will Know" (Wonder) (Radio edit) (From Characters) – 4:00
"Boogie On Reggae Woman" (Wonder) (Single version) (From Fulfillingness' First Finale) – 4:06
"Higher Ground" (Wonder) (Single version) (From Innervisions) – 3:07
"These Three Words" (Wonder) (From the Original Motion Picture Soundtrack Jungle Fever) – 4:53
"Stay Gold" (Wonder, Carmine Coppola) (From the Original Motion Picture The Outsiders) – 3:33
"Love Light in Flight" (Wonder) (From the Original Motion Picture Soundtrack The Woman in Red) – 6:54
"Mister Kiss Lonely Good-Bye" (Wonder) (Album versions appears on the Original Motion Picture Soundtrack The Adventures of Pinocchio) – 4:05
"Hold On to Your Dream" (Wonder) – 4:19
"Redemption Song" (Bob Marley) (From the Original Motion Picture Soundtrack Get On the Bus)  – 3:46

Single disc edition
"Isn't She Lovely" (Stevie Wonder) (From Songs in the Key of Life) - 3:20
"I Just Called to Say I Love You" (Wonder) (From the Original Motion Picture Soundtrack The Woman in Red) - 4:22
"Superstition" (Wonder) (From Talking Book) - 4:00
"Sir Duke" (Wonder) (From Songs in the Key of Life) - 3:52
"Master Blaster (Jammin')" (Wonder) (From Hotter than July) - 4:49
"Ebony & Ivory" (Paul McCartney) (From Paul McCartney's Tug of War) - 3:41
"Happy Birthday" (Wonder) (From Hotter than July) - 5:53
"Living for the City" (Wonder) (From Innervisions) - 3:41
"He's Misstra Know-It-All" (Wonder) (From Innervisions) - 5:34
"You Are the Sunshine of My Life" (Wonder) (From Talking Book) - 2:56
"Lately" (Wonder) (From Hotter Than July) - 4:05
"Part-Time Lover" (Wonder) (From In Square Circle) - 3:43
"My Cherie Amour" (Cosby, Wonder, Moy) (From My Cherie Amour) - 2:52
"Yester-Me, Yester-You, Yesterday" (Ron Miller, Bryan Wells) (From My Cherie Amour) - 3:05
"Uptight (Everything's Alright)" (Cosby, Moy, Wonder) (From Up-Tight) - 2:53
"I Was Made to Love Her" (Cosby, Hardaway, Moy, Wonder) (From I Was Made to Love Her) 2:36
"For Once in My Life" (Miller, Orlando Murden) (From For Once in My Life) - 2:48
"Signed, Sealed, Delivered I'm Yours" (Wonder, Garrett, Wright, Hardaway) (From Signed, Sealed & Delivered) - 2:39
"For Your Love" (Wonder) (From Conversation Peace) - 4:04
"Kiss Lonely Good-Bye" (Wonder) (Album versions appears on the Original Motion Picture Soundtrack The Adventures of Pinocchio) - 4:08
"Redemption Song" (Bob Marley) (From the Original Motion Picture Soundtrack Get On the Bus) - 3:47

Australian edition
"Isn't She Lovely" (Stevie Wonder) (From Songs in the Key of Life) - 3:20
"I Just Called to Say I Love You" (Wonder) (From the Original Motion Picture Soundtrack The Woman in Red) - 4:22
"Superstition" (Wonder) (From Talking Book) - 4:00
"Higher Ground" (Wonder) (Single version) (From Innervisions) – 3:07
"Boogie On Reggae Woman" (Wonder) (Single version) (From Fulfillingness' First Finale) – 4:06
"Master Blaster (Jammin')" (Wonder) (From Hotter than July) - 4:49
"Ebony & Ivory" (Paul McCartney) (From Paul McCartney's Tug of War) - 3:41
"Happy Birthday" (Wonder) (From Hotter than July) - 5:53
"Living for the City" (Wonder) (From Innervisions) - 3:41
"All In Love Is Fair" (Wonder) (From Innervisions) - 3:39
"You Are the Sunshine of My Life" (Wonder) (From Talking Book) - 2:56
"Lately" (Wonder) (From Hotter Than July) - 4:05
"Part-Time Lover" (Wonder) (From In Square Circle) - 3:43
"My Cherie Amour" (Cosby, Wonder, Moy) (From My Cherie Amour) - 2:52
"Yester-Me, Yester-You, Yesterday" (Ron Miller, Bryan Wells) (From My Cherie Amour) - 3:05
"Uptight (Everything's Alright)" (Cosby, Moy, Wonder) (From Up-Tight) - 2:53
"I Was Made to Love Her" (Cosby, Hardaway, Moy, Wonder) (From I Was Made to Love Her) 2:36
"For Once in My Life" (Miller, Orlando Murden) (From For Once in My Life) - 2:48
"Signed, Sealed, Delivered I'm Yours" (Wonder, Garrett, Wright, Hardaway) (From Signed, Sealed & Delivered) - 2:39
"Kiss Lonely Good-Bye" (Wonder) (Album versions appears on the Original Motion Picture Soundtrack The Adventures of Pinocchio) - 4:08
"Redemption Song" (Bob Marley) (From the Original Motion Picture Soundtrack Get On the Bus) - 3:47

Charts

Certifications

Notes 

1996 greatest hits albums
Stevie Wonder compilation albums
Motown compilation albums
Albums produced by Stevie Wonder
Albums produced by Hank Cosby